Roy Files (born 23 October 1933) is a former  Australian rules footballer who played with North Melbourne in the Victorian Football League (VFL).

Files played with Rochester in the Bendigo Football League in 1955.

Notes

External links 

Living people
1933 births
Australian rules footballers from Victoria (Australia)
North Melbourne Football Club players